Shmuel Hanavi ( Samuel the Prophet) may refer to:

 Samuel (bible), the Prophet
 Shmuel HaNavi (neighborhood), a neighborhood in Jerusalem, Israel
 Shmuel HaNavi Street, a major thoroughfare bordering the neighborhood